"Ragga Bomb" is a song by American record producer Skrillex, featuring vocals from British jungle music duo Ragga Twins. It was released on March 14, 2014 as part of Skrillex's debut studio album Recess (2014). It entered the Flanders Ultratip 100 at number 75. An EP entitled Ease My Mind v Ragga Bomb Remixes, consisting of remixes of both songs, was released on November 24, 2014.

Music video 
An official music video to accompany the release of "Ragga Bomb" was released onto YouTube on April 1, 2014. It was directed by Terence Neale.

Track listing

Credits and personnel 
 Sonny "Skrillex" Moore – production
 Trevor Destouche – vocals
 David Destouche – vocals

Chart performance

Weekly charts

Year-end charts

References 

2014 singles
Skrillex songs
Song recordings produced by Skrillex
Songs written by Skrillex
2014 songs